The Musée d'Art et d'Histoire (in English: Art and History Museum), is a museum located in the historical city of Saint-Denis, France, in the northern outskirts of Paris.

The museum, established in 1982, is located in an ancient cloister of the order of the Carmelites, founded in 1625, not far from the Basilique Saint-Denis.

The museum holds displays about the Carmelites, the Paris Commune and the surrealist poet, Paul Éluard. There is also an archaeological department focusing on the ancient finds in and around the Basilique Saint-Denis.

From September to December 2007, the museum had a display about the Silk Road, entitled "Marco Polo et le Livre des Merveilles".

Recommended access is underground Metro station Saint-Denis Porte de Paris, on Line 13, located about 100 meters south of the museum.

Gallery
(Temporary Marco Polo exhibit, September–December 2007)

References

Museums established in 1982
Museums in Seine-Saint-Denis
Art museums and galleries in Île-de-France
History museums in France
Musee d'Art et d'Histoire